A brickworks is a factory for making bricks.

Brickworks may also refer to:

Places
Brickworks, Singapore, a subzone of Bukit Batok, Singapore
Brickworks Group Representation Constituency, a defunct Group Representation Constituency in Bukit Merah
Brickworks Single Member Constituency, a defunct a constituency in Singapore
Brickworks, Khorramabad, Qazvin, a company town and village in Khorramabad Rural District, Esfarvarin District, Takestan County, Qazvin Province, Iran
Brickworks, Semnan, a company town and village in Howmeh Rural District, in the Central District of Semnan County, Semnan Province, Iran.

Other uses

Brick Works De Panoven, a museum in Zevenaar, the Gelderland, the Netherlands
Brickworks Limited, Australian building materials company
Brickworks Marketplace, shopping centre on the site of a former brickworks in Adelaide, South Australia

See also
Brickwork